Airani  is a village in the southern state of Karnataka, India. It is located in the Ranibennur taluk of Haveri district in Karnataka.

See also
 Ranebennur
 Haveri
 Districts of Karnataka

References

External links
 https://web.archive.org/web/20090224190639/http://ranebennurcity.gov.in/
 http://Haveri.nic.in/

Villages in Haveri district